USS Kermoor was a United States Navy cargo ship in commission from 1918 to 1919.

Construction, early career, acquisition, and commissioning
Kermoor was built in 1907 at Sunderland, England, by JL Thompson and Sons, Ltd as the Austro-Hungarian commercial cargo ship SS Morawitz. Upon the outbreak of World War I in August 1914, she took refuge at Galveston, Texas, in the then-neutral United States to avoid capture or destruction by Allied forces. When the United States took control of all Central Powers merchant ships in its ports in April 1917 when it entered the war on the side of the Allies, it seized German ships and acquired all the Austro-Hungarian merchant ships in its own and other Western Hemisphere ports, although since there was no state of war with Austria-Hungary this was accomplished by purchase. Eight former Austro-Hungarian cargo ships thus became the property of the Kerr Navigation Company of New York City. Kerr Navigation gave them all names beginning with "Ker," Morawitz becoming Kermoor.

The United States Army took control of Kermoor on 14 March 1918 for World War I service. The US Navy acquired her from the Army at Cardiff, Wales, on 1 November 1918 and commissioned her the same day as USS Kermoor. Unlike most commercial ships commissioned into US Navy service during World War I, Kermoor never received a naval registry Identification Number (Id. No.).

United States Navy service
Operated by the Navy under Army account, Kermoor served out of Cardiff, carrying coal and military supplies between UK and French ports until 1 March 1919.

Detached from this cross-English Channel service on 1 March 1919, Kermoor departed Queenstown, Ireland, for the United States on 6 March 1919 with a cargo of military stores. She reached Baltimore, Maryland, on 27 March 1919, then departed for New York City on 21 April 1919. She arrived there on 23 April 1919 and discharged her cargo.

Kermoor was decommissioned at Hoboken, New Jersey, on 5 May 1919 and transferred to the United States Shipping Board the same day for simultaneous return to the Kerr Navigation Company.

Later career
Kermoor resumed commercial operations as SS Kermoor. In 1921, she was transferred to the Hungarian flag and resumed the name Morawitz. She was transferred to the UK flag and renamed Purley Oaks in 1927. She was scrapped at Rosyth, Scotland in 1936.

Notes

References

Department of the Navy Naval Historical Center Online Library of Selected Images US Navy Ships USS Kermoor (1918-1919) Previously the Austro-Hungarian freighter Morawitz (1907). Later named Kermoor, Morawitz, and Purley Oaks
NavSource Online: Section Patrol Craft Photo Archive: Kermoor

1907 ships
Cargo ships of the United States Navy
Merchant ships of the United Kingdom
Steamships of Austria-Hungary
Steamships of the United Kingdom
Steamships of the United States
Ships built on the River Wear
World War I cargo ships of the United States